Jack Bavin (25 May 1921 – 11 March 2001 ) was an English footballer, who played as a full back in the Football League for Tranmere Rovers.

References

External links

1921 births
2001 deaths
Tranmere Rovers F.C. players
Leith Athletic F.C. players
Arbroath F.C. players
English Football League players
Association football fullbacks
Ballymena United F.C. players
Scottish Football League players
English footballers
People from South Ferriby